Dischidia imbricata is a plant in the genus Dischidia native to Southeast Asia from Vietnam to Borneo and Java. Like Hoya imbricata, Dischidia imbricata is a shingling plant that, as it grows epiphytically, clings closely to the host plant and may even have leaves that are completely flat like roof shingles.

References

Dischidia
Plants described in 1840